Beau Geisler (born January 14, 1981) is an American former professional ice hockey defenseman.

Geisler played four seasons of professional hockey, including parts of three seasons in the ECHL where he registered 13 goals and 55 assists for 68 points, while earning 84 penalty minutes, in 126 games played.

Awards and honors

References

External links

1981 births
Living people
American men's ice hockey defensemen
HK Riga 2000 players
Manchester Monarchs (AHL) players
Minnesota Duluth Bulldogs men's ice hockey players
Reading Royals players
Stockton Thunder players
AHCA Division I men's ice hockey All-Americans